The 1080s BC was a decade which lasted from 1089 BC to 1080 BC.

Events and trends
Iron Age continues
1089 BC—Melanthus, legendary King of Athens, dies after a reign of 37 years and is succeeded by his son Codrus.
Early 1080s BC- Herihor, the high-priest of Amon, usurps Ramesses XI's authority, becoming the de facto ruler of Upper Egypt.
1082 BC- Babylonia suffers from a severe famine.
c.1081 BC- Herihor dies.
Early phase of transition from New Kingdom Period to Third Intermediate Period in Egypt continues.

Significant people
Tiglath-Pileser I, King of Assyria, r. c.1114–1076 BC
Melanthus, Legendary King of Athens, r. c.1126–1089 BC. 
Codrus, Legendary King of Athens, r. c.1089–1068 BC
Marduk-nadin-ahhe, King of Babylon, r. 1100–1082 BC
Marduk-shapik-zeri, King of Babylon, r. 1082–1069 BC
Di Yi, Shang dynasty king of China, r. c.1101–1076 BC
Ramesses XI, Pharaoh of Egypt, r. 1107–1077 BC
Herihor, High priest of Amon
Eli, Judge of Ancient Israel

References